Clabony is a town in Saint Andrew Parish, Grenada.  It is located at the center of the island.

References

Populated places in Grenada
Saint Andrew Parish, Grenada